Ralph Adolphus Lewis (born March 28, 1963) is a retired American professional basketball player. He was a 6'6" (198 cm) 200 lb (91 kg) guard and attended La Salle University.

La Salle
In college, Lewis scored 1,807 points (15.6 ppg average) in his four years at La Salle.  He was named to the First Team All-MAAC (1983–1984 and 1984–1985) and First Team All Big 5 in 1984 and 1985. Lewis received the Geasey Award as the Big 5 Player of the Year in 1984, when he helped the Explorers become Big 5 co-champions.  He was inducted into La Salle Hall of Athletes in 1990 and the Big 5 Hall of Fame in 1991.

NBA
Lewis was selected by the Boston Celtics in the 1985 NBA Draft and began his career in 1987 with the Detroit Pistons. He also played with the Charlotte Hornets.

Coaching career
Lewis became an assistant coach with the Seattle SuperSonics in 2005. Prior to that he was the head coach of the NBA Development League's Huntsville Flight for three seasons, compiling a 73–71 win–loss record. On December 26, 2010, Lewis was one of three assistants hired to serve under interim Charlotte Bobcats head coach Paul Silas.

Personal life
In 2006, while Lewis was an assistant with the Sonics, his 82-year-old maternal grandmother was killed in Philadelphia. She suffered multiple stab wounds to her chest and throat.

References

External links
College & NBA stats @ basketballreference.com

1963 births
Living people
African-American basketball coaches
African-American basketball players
American men's basketball players
Basketball coaches from Pennsylvania
Bay State Bombardiers players
Boston Celtics draft picks
Charlotte Bobcats assistant coaches
Charlotte Hornets expansion draft picks
Charlotte Hornets players
Columbus Horizon players
Detroit Pistons players
Huntsville Flight coaches
La Salle Explorers men's basketball players
Oklahoma City Thunder assistant coaches
Pensacola Tornados (1986–1991) players
Rapid City Thrillers players
Seattle SuperSonics assistant coaches
Shooting guards
Sioux Falls Skyforce (CBA) players
Basketball players from Philadelphia
21st-century African-American people
20th-century African-American sportspeople